Honeygo is a census designated place in Baltimore County, Maryland, United States. It first appeared as a CDP in the 2020 Census with a population of 12,927.

Demographics

2020 census

Note: the US Census treats Hispanic/Latino as an ethnic category. This table excludes Latinos from the racial categories and assigns them to a separate category. Hispanics/Latinos can be of any race.

References

Census-designated places in Baltimore County, Maryland
Census-designated places in Maryland